Susan Steinberg or Sue Steinberg may refer to:

Susan Steinberg (author), American author
Susan Steinberg (producer), American television producer, director and writer